C. B. Smith Park is a public park located in Pembroke Pines, Florida. C. B. Smith Park offers many sporting activities including fishing, basketball, batting cages, miniature golf, as well as tennis and racquetball courts. C.B. Smith Park also has an area that is home to the endangered Burrowing Owl.

History
C.B. Smith Park was originally a plot of land that was purchased in 1959 by Broward County from the U.S. Government. Before the purchase, it was known as Snake Creek Park and was a firing range for a gunnery school during World War II. In 1967 it was renamed in honor of Commissioner Charles Barney Smith, who served the Broward County and the City of Hollywood Commission.

Attractions
Paradise Cove is the water park at C.B. Smith that is open seasonally with blackout dates during certain times of each month. It features four 50-foot-tall water slides, Sharky's Lagoon, a water playground for all ages, Parrot's Point, a water playground for children 5 and under and Crazy Creek, a 410-foot-long lazy river. 
The park also has the following features: basketball, batting cages, biking/jogging/walking paths, campground, fishing, fitness facility, golf, horseshoes, miniature golf, picnic areas, playground, racquetball/tennis, shelter rental and volleyball.

Events
The 99.9 KISS Country Chili CookOff is the largest country music festival and chili competition in South Florida. It first began in 1986 and is held every year in late January. The concert features a variety of famous country artists every year such as Brooks & Dunn, Luke Combs, Darius Rucker and more.

External links

Broward County Park and Recreation Division Homepage

C.B. Smith Park
KISS Country Chili CookOff 2019
Paradise Cove Water Park

Parks in Broward County, Florida
Pembroke Pines, Florida
1959 establishments in Florida